Szabolcs Kilyén (born 19 March 1998) is a Romanian professional footballer of Hungarian ethnicity who plays as a defender for AFC Odorheiu Secuiesc, on loan from Nyíregyháza Spartacus.

Club career
He spent his youth years at LPS Pitești and the Gheorghe Hagi Academy. He got his first professional contract from Viitorul Constanța at age 18 in 2016. In the four years that he stayed at the club he was mostly loaned to Liga II and Liga I sides. In 2020 he joined Vasas.

International career
At youth level he played for both the Romania under-17 and the Romania under-19 teams.

He was member of the Székely Land squad that finished 4th at the 2018 ConIFA World Football Cup.

Honours
Odorheiu Secuiesc
Liga III: 2021–22

Career statistics

Club

References

External links 

1998 births
Living people
People from Mureș County
Romanian sportspeople of Hungarian descent
Romanian footballers
Romania youth international footballers
Association football defenders
Liga I players
Liga II players
Liga III players
FC Viitorul Constanța players
ASA 2013 Târgu Mureș players
Sepsi OSK Sfântu Gheorghe players
CS Mioveni players
FC Dinamo București players
Nemzeti Bajnokság II players
Vasas SC players
Nyíregyháza Spartacus FC players